V is the fifth studio album by the instrumental stoner rock band Karma to Burn. It was released on May 27, 2011, via Napalm Records. The album was later reissued in 2022 by Heavy Psych Sounds Records.

Unlike previous releases, V is not solely an instrumental album. Five tracks are instrumental; the other three feature vocals from Year Long Disaster frontman Daniel Davies who had joined the group but left prior to the album's release. As with previous albums, instrumental tracks are named with numbers. Vocal tracks are named with words. The album title is derived from the Roman numeral of five.

Track listing
Standard release

Personnel 
 William Mecum – guitar
 Rich Mullins – bass
 Rob Oswald – drums
 Daniel Davies – vocals ("The Cynics", "Jimmy D", Never Say Die")

References

2011 albums
Karma to Burn albums
Napalm Records albums
Instrumental rock albums